Francisco Javier Tarantino Uriarte (born 26 June 1984) is a Spanish former professional footballer who played as a left-back.

He amassed Segunda División totals of 142 games and three goals over six seasons, with Numancia, Alavés and Albacete. In La Liga, he appeared for Athletic Bilbao and Numancia.

Club career
Born in Bermeo, Biscay, Tarantino joined Athletic Bilbao's youth system in 1996, aged 12. He then proceeded to move up the ranks, appearing for the farm team in the Tercera División and the reserves in the Segunda División B.

Tarantino was loaned to CD Numancia midway through 2004–05, making his La Liga debut with that club. His first match in the competition occurred on 30 January 2005, playing the full 90 minutes in a 1–2 home loss against Real Madrid; at the end of the season – where he scored once in another home defeat, this time against Racing de Santander (3–2)– his team was relegated.

Tarantino returned to Athletic for the 2005–06 campaign. He was sent off twice in only three games, and eventually was again loaned to Numancia, with the Soria side now in the Segunda División where he spent the following five years, also representing Deportivo Alavés and Albacete Balompié.

From 2011 onwards, Tarantino took his game to the third tier, starting with CD Tenerife.

Honours
Spain U16
UEFA European Under-16 Championship: 2001

Spain U23
Mediterranean Games: 2005

References

External links

1984 births
Living people
People from Bermeo
Sportspeople from Biscay
Spanish footballers
Footballers from the Basque Country (autonomous community)
Association football defenders
La Liga players
Segunda División players
Segunda División B players
Tercera División players
CD Basconia footballers
Bilbao Athletic footballers
Athletic Bilbao footballers
CD Numancia players
Deportivo Alavés players
Albacete Balompié players
CD Tenerife players
FC Cartagena footballers
Sestao River footballers
Bermeo FT footballers
Spain youth international footballers
Spain under-21 international footballers
Spain under-23 international footballers
Competitors at the 2005 Mediterranean Games
Mediterranean Games medalists in football
Mediterranean Games gold medalists for Spain